Mahomet-Seymour High School, abbreviated MSHS, is a public high school in Mahomet, Illinois. It is a part of Mahomet-Seymour Community Unit School District 3.

History
Mahomet-Seymour High School was built in 1981 and has since undergone expansion as the community of Mahomet continues to grow. The latest expansion was completed in August 2000 and brought . (when completed the building was over ) of additional space to the building, increased student capacity to 1,100, and cost $8,701,400. As of the 2018-2019 school year, the school has an enrollment of 958 students and a faculty of fifty-five full-time teachers.

On May 5, 2007, school board members unanimously approved a Mahomet-Seymour Schools Foundation plan to raise money to build a greenhouse. In early 2008, the greenhouse was pronounced to be ready for spring. It is currently fully operational and functional for students in Agriculture classes to use.

Academics
The Chicago Sun-Times ranked MSHS 34th based on state test scores in 2013.

The Chicago Sun-Times ranked MSHS 28th in 2018-2019.

In 2020, Niche rated MSHS #40 out of 671 for Best Public High School Teachers in Illinois. Niche also ranked the school #54 out of 689 for Best Public High Schools in Illinois.

U.S. News rated MSHS #1 in Champaign, IL Metro Area High Schools in 2019.

Athletics
Mahomet-Seymour High School offers baseball, basketball, cheerleading, cross country, dance, football, golf, soccer, softball, swimming, tennis, track and field, volleyball, and wrestling. They have won 6 IHSA State trophies since 2010.

Mahomet-Seymour boys golf won the 2A IHSA State meet in 2010.

Mahomet-Seymour dance team won the 1A IHSA State meet in 2015.

Mahomet-Seymour boys cross country won the 2A IHSA State meet in 2016 and 2017.  They also were runner-up in the 2A IHSA State meet in 2014 and 2015.

Extracurricular Activities
Mahomet-Seymour's marching band the Marching Bulldogs placed first out of eight teams in the Fiesta Bowl parade in 2019. Mahomet-Seymour's math team took the state championship in 2021 and 2019, 3rd place in 2018, and back to back champions in 2017 and 2016.

References

Public high schools in Illinois
Schools in Champaign County, Illinois